Inamullah Khan Yaqeen (1727  1755) was a Mughal Indian poet. He wrote one hundred seventy ghazals, a genre of Urdu poetry. Most of his ghazals include five couplets, leading his writings to become one of the distinguished poetry. In 2013,  Zahidul Haque, faculty of Urdu Department of the University of Hyderabad wrote a book titled Inamullah Khan Yaqeen: Ahad aur Shairi (Inamullah Khan Yaqeen: Age and Poetry) on Yaqeen's life which was later published by Rao Publishing House.

Biography 
A disciple of Mirza Mazhar Jan-e-Janaan, he was born around 1827-28 in Maratha Empire (in modern-day Delhi). He died in Delhi at the age of 28 around 
1755-56, however some uncertain literary historians claim that he was murdered by his father Nawab Azharuddin Khan.

References 

1727 births
1755 deaths
Mughal Empire poets
Poets from Delhi
18th-century Indian poets